Connor Farrell is a former professional rugby league footballer who last played as a  or  for the Bradford Bulls in the Betfred Championship.

Background
Farrell was born in Wigan, Greater Manchester, England. He is the younger brother of Wigan player Liam Farrell, nephew of Andy Farrell and first cousin of Owen Farrell.

Career
Farrell made his Super League début for Wigan on 18 June 2014 in a 48–4 victory over Widnes.

In July 2017, he joined Featherstone Rovers on loan until the end of the season.

At the end of the cancelled 2020 season, Farrell announced his retirement on social media. His decision was based on recurring injuries which he could not recover from.

References

External links
Featherstone Rovers profile

1993 births
Living people
Bradford Bulls players
English people of Irish descent
English rugby league players
Farrell family
Featherstone Rovers players
Rugby league players from Wigan
Rugby league second-rows
South Wales Scorpions players
Swinton Lions players
Widnes Vikings players
Wigan Warriors players
Workington Town players